James Winston (1773–1843) was an English strolling player and theatre manager. He was as the first secretary of the Garrick Club, fulfilling the role from 1831 until his death in 1842.

References

1773 births
1843 deaths